Marshall Historic District is a national historic district located at Marshall, Fauquier County, Virginia.  It encompasses 314 contributing buildings and 3 contributing sites in the rural village of Marshall.  The district represents a collection of historic buildings with a wide range of building types and architectural styles that date from the end of the 18th century to the mid-20th century.  Notable buildings include the Fauquier Heritage and Preservation Foundation building (c. 1771), hosteller's house for Rector's Ordinary (c. 1800), a store and Confederate post office (c. 1805), the Elgin House (c. 1820, 1892), former Marshall Pharmacy (c. 1830), the Foley Building (c. 1830), the Gothic Revival style Trinity Episcopal Church (1849), Salem Baptist Church (1929), Marshall United Methodist Church (1899), and the Marshall Ford Company (1916), reputed to be the oldest building built as a Ford dealership in the United States that is still functioning as such.

It was listed on the National Register of Historic Places in 2007.

Gallery
Some of the contributing buildings in the Marshall Historic District:

References

Historic districts in Fauquier County, Virginia
Federal architecture in Virginia
Gothic Revival architecture in Virginia
National Register of Historic Places in Fauquier County, Virginia
Historic districts on the National Register of Historic Places in Virginia